Shentalinsky District is an administrative and municipal district (raion), one of the twenty-seven in Samara Oblast, Russia. It is located in the northeast of the oblast. Its administrative center is the rural locality (a railway station) of Shentala. Population: 16,656 (2010 Census);  The population of Shentala accounts for 39.7% of the district's total population.

References

Notes

Sources

Districts of Samara Oblast